Devotional may refer to:

 Daily devotional, Christian religious publication
 Devotional (video), of the 1993 Depeche Mode tour

See also

 Devotion (disambiguation)
 Devotional song, a hymn which accompanies religious observances and rituals
 Devotional Songs, a 1992 studio album by Nusrat Fateh Ali Khan
 Devotional Tour, a 1993 concert tour by Depeche Mode
 Christian devotional literature, religious writing designed for personal edification and spiritual formation
 Filmi devotional songs, in Hindi movies
 Hindu devotional movements, various forms of Hinduism in India